Raniżów  is a village in Kolbuszowa County, Subcarpathian Voivodeship, in south-eastern Poland. It is the seat of the gmina (administrative district) called Gmina Raniżów.

The village has a population of 2,200.

References

External links 
 Joachim Popek: Kolonizacja józefińska w Galicji. Studium na przykładzie wsi Ranischau. In: Polska – Słowacja – Ukraina. Trójpogranicze wielokulturowe, 2014

Villages in Kolbuszowa County